Carex altaica is a species of sedge and is native to Mongolia, Siberia, and northwestern China.

References 

altaica
Flora of China
Flora of Russia
Flora of Mongolia